The Cathedral Parish of Saint Paul the First Hermit, also known as the San Pablo Cathedral, is the see of the Bishop of the Roman Catholic Diocese of San Pablo located in San Pablo, Philippines. Its titular is St. Paul the First Hermit and its feast is celebrated every January 15.

History

16th to 18th centuries
Spanish captain Juan de Salcedo first arrived in the upland village of Sampaloc in 1571. The area's name was officially changed to San Pablo de los Montes in 1586, in honor of St. Paul the First Hermit. That same year, San Pablo became an independent parish, and the first church made of wood was constructed under the auspices of Augustinian Father Mateo Mendoza.

From 1618 to 1629, a second church was constructed from stone by Father Hernando Cabrera. In 1680 Father Juan Labo laid the foundations for the current church. This building was started in 1714 and completed in 1721 by Father Francisco Juan de Elorreaga, OSA. The Franciscans later administered the parish of San Pablo (which was then part of the province of Batangas) on April 4, 1794 with Father Andres Cabrera, OFM as parish priest. Father Cabrera added the brick-stone wall and built a stone cemetery in 1796.

19th century
Renovations on the church building and the convent were conducted from 1839 to 1858 under the auspices of Father Peregrin Prosper. Fathers Eugenio Garcia, Francisco Vellon, and Santiago Bravo added the transept from 1871 to 1877, 1878 to 1884, and 1884 to 1888, respectively. In 1898 administration was transferred to the secular priests, with Father Francisco Alcantara as the first parish priest from the seculars.

20th century
The convent housed the Minor Seminary of St. Francis of Sales of the Congregation of the Mission (also known as Padre Paules) from 1912 to 1939. The convent was heavily damaged during the liberation of the Philippines in 1945. With the help of the parishioners, the church was rebuilt from 1948 to 1954 under the supervision of Fathers Juan Coronel and Nicomedes Rosal.

The parish church of San Pablo became a cathedral with the establishment of the Roman Catholic Diocese of San Pablo by the Apostolic Letter Ecclesianum Perempla on November 28, 1966. It was canonically erected on April 18, 1967, with Bishop Pedro N. Bantigue installed as the first bishop of San Pablo.

21st Century
In 2013, Bishop Leo Drona of the San Pablo diocese submitted his resignation to Pope Benedict XVI and the pope named Bishop Buenaventura Famadico to succeed him. The diocese is estimated at over two million Catholics.

In, 2015 the facade of the Cathedral was restored to its original design sans the concrete crown added in the American Period. Damage done when a concrete porte cochere was added were repaired. Restoration was scheduled to be done by the end of the Diocesan 50th Jubilee.

Gallery

Notes

Bibliography

External links

Cathedral Parish of Saint Paul the First Hermit on Facebook

Buildings and structures in San Pablo, Laguna
Roman Catholic churches in Laguna (province)
Marked Historical Structures of the Philippines
Roman Catholic cathedrals in the Philippines
Churches in the Roman Catholic Diocese of San Pablo